Sea and Sardinia is a travel book by the English writer D. H. Lawrence. It describes a brief excursion undertaken in January 1921 by Lawrence and his wife Frieda, a.k.a. Queen Bee, from Taormina in Sicily to the interior of Sardinia. They visited Cagliari, Mandas, Sorgono, and Nuoro. His visit to Nuoro was a kind of homage to Grazia Deledda but involved no personal encounter. Despite the brevity of his visit, Lawrence distils an essence of the island and its people that is still recognisable today.
Extracts were originally printed in The Dial during October and November 1921 and the book was first published in New York, USA in 1921 by Thomas Seltzer, with illustrations by Jan Juta. A British edition, published by Martin Secker, came out in April 1923.

Standard edition 
 Sea and Sardinia (1921), edited by Mara Kalnins, Cambridge University Press, 1997, .
 Sea and Sardinia (1921), edited by Jon Clarke (Publisher & Editor) - The Olive Press, London , 1989 .
 Italian edition: Mare e Sardegna, Introduzione di Luciano Marrocu, Nuoro, Ilisso, Scrittori di Sardegna, 2000 .
 Online version with illustrations online-literature.com

References

External links
 Internet Archive on-line edition: 
 

1921 non-fiction books
British travel books
Works originally published in The Dial
Books about Italy
English non-fiction books